Kallokibotion is an extinct genus of stem-turtle from the Upper Cretaceous (Maastrichtian, 86–66 million years ago), known from fossils found in Romania. One species is known, Kallokibotion bajazidi, which was named by Franz Nopcsa after his lover Bajazid Doda. It literally means 'beautiful box of Bajazid'; Nopcsa chose the name because, in the words of British palaeontologist Gareth Dyke, "the shape of the shell reminded him of Bajazid's arse". A second undescribed species is known from the Santonian of Hungary.

Description 
Kallokibotion reached  in carapace length. There are jagged ornaments on its shell.

Taxonomy 
A fossil of this turtle was mistakenly described as a pterosaur of the genus Thalassodromeus in 2014. In 1992, it was identified as a basal cryptodire, and as a meiolaniid in the early 2010's. Later phylogenetic analysis based on characters described from new specimens places Kallokibotion as the sister taxon of the crown testudines. A 2021 analysis placed Kallokibotion in Compsemydidae within Paracryptodira.

References 

Late Cretaceous reptiles of Europe
Testudinata
Fossil taxa described in 1923
Prehistoric reptile genera
Taxa named by Franz Nopcsa von Felső-Szilvás